Thrift Wood is a  biological Site of Special Scientific Interest south-east of Bicknacre in Essex. It is managed by the Essex Wildlife Trust.

The site is an ancient semi-natural wood on acid soil. It is of two types, both unusual habitats, pedunculate oak/hornbeam and sessile oak/hornbeam. Wild service trees and elders are found in the shrub layer, and a pond has a raised sphagnum bog. Twenty species of butterfly have been recorded.

There is access from Main Road.

References

Sites of Special Scientific Interest in Essex
Essex Wildlife Trust